Nikolaos "Nikos" Michelis (born 23 March 2001) is a Greek professional footballer who plays as a centre-back for Segunda División club Mirandés.

Career

Milan 
During his maiden full campaign in Italy, Michelis made 15 appearances for Milan’s youth team in the Primavera, popping up with the one assist in a 5–2 victory against Entella at home in November 2019.

Loan to Willem II 

On 13 July 2021, Michelis was loaned to Eredivisie club Willem II until the end of the season, with an option to buy when the loan is over.

Mirandés
On 30 July 2022, Michelis signed a three-year contract with Spanish Segunda División side CD Mirandés.

References

2001 births
Footballers from Athens
Greek footballers
Living people
Association football defenders
Greece youth international footballers
Greece under-21 international footballers
Eredivisie players
Willem II (football club) players
Segunda División players
CD Mirandés footballers
Greek expatriate footballers
Expatriate footballers in Italy
Greek expatriate sportspeople in Italy
Expatriate footballers in the Netherlands
Greek expatriate sportspeople in the Netherlands
Expatriate footballers in Spain
Greek expatriate sportspeople in Spain